WLLA (channel 64) is a religious independent television station licensed to Kalamazoo, Michigan, United States, serving West Michigan. Owned by Christian Faith Broadcast, Inc., it is a sister station to WGGN-TV in Sandusky, Ohio. WLLA's studios are located on East N Avenue in Kalamazoo, and its transmitter is located near Stewart Lake in Orangeville Township.

History
The station signed on the air on June 30, 1987. In 2007, the station entered a revenue sharing agreement with long distance telephone carrier Accxx Communications.

Technical information

Subchannels
The station's digital signal is multiplexed:

The station began carrying programming from MeTV on digital subchannel 64.2 on July 4, 2013.

Analog-to-digital conversion
WLLA shut down its analog signal, over UHF channel 64, on November 1, 2008. The station's digital signal remained on its pre-transition UHF channel 45, using PSIP to display the WLLA's virtual channel as 64 on digital television receivers, which was among the high band UHF channels (52–69) that were removed from broadcasting use as a result of the transition.

References

External links

WLLA TV Channel 64 Kalamazoo. Michigan's Radio and TV Broadcast Guide.

Television channels and stations established in 1987
LLA
Religious television stations in the United States
MeTV affiliates
Heroes & Icons affiliates
Decades (TV network) affiliates
Retro TV affiliates
Dabl affiliates
1987 establishments in Michigan
Companies based in Kalamazoo, Michigan